This is a list of airlines which have a current Air Operator Certificate issued by the Civil Aviation Administration of China. 
All airlines listed below are based in Mainland China. For airlines of Hong Kong and Macau, see List of airlines of Hong Kong and List of airlines of Macau.

Scheduled airlines

Major

Low-cost airlines

Minor

Regional

Cargo airlines

See also 

 List of defunct airlines of Asia
 List of defunct airlines of China
 List of airlines of Hong Kong
 List of airlines of Macau
 List of airlines
 List of airline holding companies

 Airports
 List of airports in China
 China's busiest airports by passenger traffic

China